Mark Buckland (born 18 August 1961 in Cheltenham) is an English former footballer, who played in the Football League for Wolverhampton Wanderers.

Career
Buckland started his football career with his hometown team Cheltenham Town .

In November 1983 he played for AP Leamington in their FA Cup tie against Gillingham.

He signed for First Division Wolverhampton Wanderers in 1984. He had only one full season at Molineux, 1984-85, during which he made 41 appearances in total. He scored five goals but the club again suffered relegation in what proved his only season in league football.

He was still playing on his 50th birthday in 2011 for Bishop's Cleeve 3rd team.

References

1961 births
Living people
Sportspeople from Cheltenham
English footballers
English Football League players
National League (English football) players
Wolverhampton Wanderers F.C. players
Kidderminster Harriers F.C. players
Cheltenham Town F.C. players
Gloucester City A.F.C. players
Leamington F.C. players
Association football defenders
Association football midfielders